Teleac may refer to:

Places
 Teleac, a village in Ciugud Commune, Alba County, Romania
 Teleac, a village in Budureasa Commune, Bihor County, Romania
 Teleac, a village in Feliceni Commune, Harghita County, Romania
 Teleac, a village in Gornești Commune, Mureș County, Romania

Other
 Teleac (broadcaster), a former Dutch public educational broadcaster